Sirin, was a Palestinian Arab village located  north of Beisan. The village was depopulated and destroyed in 1948.  Only the village cemetery and one house remain standing, along with the remains of a mosaic pavement and a vaulted spring dating to the Byzantine period. Mentioned in historical documents, the 1596 census indicated it had 45 households; by 1945, the number of inhabitants had risen to 810.

History
The village dated back to the Roman era. 

Near a spring were two fallen blocks, apparently lintels,  which had the appearance of being of Byzantine origin.   Several other remains from the Byzantine era were also found in the village, including a Greek inscription and parts of a mosaic pavement.

Conder suggested that it was identical with  the Sirin, a place inhabited by Samaritans in the 7th century.

In 1168, during the  Crusader era, the village was known as Losserin. That year  it was sold by a Simon Chevron to the Hospitalliers.

Ottoman era
Like other villages in Palestine, Sirin fell under the rule of the Ottoman Empire between 1517 and 1918. In the 1596 tax records, Sirin formed part of the nahiya (subdistrict) of Jenin under the liwa' ("district") of Lajjun, with a population of 45 Muslim household. Villagers paid a fixed tax rate of 25%  on a number of crops, including wheat and barley, as well as on goats and  beehives; a total of  20,600 akçe.

A map by Pierre Jacotin  from Napoleon's invasion of 1799 showed the place, named as Serin. James Silk Buckingham, who visited the village in 1816, transcribes its name as "Sereen" and describes it as being made up of about thirty to forty houses with half a dozen Bedouin tents located close to it.  In 1838  Edward Robinson noted it as one of the villages at the brow of the Jordan valley, together with Awlam.

In 1859, the  English consul estimated the population to be  about 100 inhabitants, who cultivated 35 faddans of land  In 1875 Victor Guérin found the village to have 400 inhabitants. He further noted an ancient tower, each side measuring 14 steps. The remains of two churches were seen, one of them had been transformed into a mosque. There was also a Wali nearby, called Neby Sirin. In 1882, the PEF's Survey of Western Palestine described the village of Sirin as being an adobe village of moderate size, surrounded by hedges of prickly pear.

British Mandate era
In  the 1922 census of Palestine, conducted by the  Mandatory Palestine authorities,  Sirin had a population of 681;  621 Muslims and 60 Christians, where all the Christians were Roman Catholics.  The population had decreased slightly by the  1931 census   to 630;  562  Muslims and 68 Christians, in a total of 161  houses.

In the  1945 statistics, the population was 810; 620 Muslims and 190 Christians and the total land area was 28,445 dunums.  Of the land, 413 dunums were used  for plantations and irrigable land, 15,813 for cereals, while a total of 131 dunums were classified as built-up (urban) land.

1948, aftermath
First evacuated in April 1948 by Jewish forces, by June 1948, some of the inhabitants had returned. Permanently depopulated by Israeli troops in the summer of 1948, Sirin was then completely destroyed.

Benny Morris writes that Sirin was one of the first of approximately two dozen villages that were evacuated on Arab orders in April–May 1948 for "pre-invasion military reasons."  However Ilan Pappe writes that the village had not been evacuated and that it expected that it "would be exempt from the fate of the nearby villages", due to its good connections with Jewish authorities, but that it was nonetheless occupied by Jewish troops on May 12, 1948, expelling the population and destroying the mosque, church and monastery.

When Israeli troops entered Sirin in June 1948, they that about 100 inhabitants had returned. After checking their IDs and searching for weapons (finding only some knives), the troops left the village. A report from the battalion's intelligence officer recommended, "the Arabs should be ejected from the area, the young men should be arrested, and the crops confiscated ..." Sirin, along with the villages of Hadatha, 'Ulam, and Ma'dhar, were all permanently depopulated by Israeli troops in the summer of 1948.

Walid Khalidi described all that was left of the village structures of Sirin in 1992: "The cemetery and one house (which serves as a storage room for straw) are all that remain of Sirin. Stone rubble surrounded by clusters of cactuses can be seen on the site. The site itself is used as a stockyard for cattle. The spring in the middle of the site is covered with a stone structure. Some of the land around the village is planted in cotton."

In 1994, Andrew Petersen visited Sirin, and inspected a rectangular  (10 x 12 meters) tower structure. It had two entrances, one to the north and one to the south, where the south side was the original, older part. The masonry and arches indicate that the original structure dates to the Crusader era, while the later northern entrance dated to an Ottoman reconstruction.

See also
Ein Hod

References

Bibliography

External links
 Welcome to Sirin
 Sirin, Zochrot
Survey of Western Palestine, Map 9:  IAA, Wikimedia commons 

Arab villages depopulated during the 1948 Arab–Israeli War
Ancient Samaritan settlements